GVR may refer to:

People
 A Royal cypher
 George V of the United Kingdom (GVR), whose Royal cipher was "George V Rex"
 Guido van Rossum (GvR), computer programmer known for creating the Python programming language
 Guido van Robot (GvR), a learning tool for the Python programming language
 G. Vijayaraghavan (personal website gvr.co.in) Indian cardiologist

Transportation
 Glenbrook Vintage Railway, in New Zealand
 Grand Valley Railway, in the western United States
 Gwendraeth Valley Railway, in Wales; a component of the Burry Port and Gwendraeth Valley Railway
 Goresuar train station (rail code: GVR), see List of railway stations in India
 Governador Valadares Airport (IATA airport code: GVR; ICAO airport code: SBGV;), in Brazil

Other uses
 Green Valley Ranch, resort near Las Vegas
 Gurung language (ISO 639 language code: gvr)
 Grant, vacate, remand order, an order issued by the U.S. Supreme Court to grant a writ of certiorari for the sole purpose of vacating the judgment below and remanding it to the court below for further consideration.

See also

 George V (disambiguation)